Bedford, Quebec may refer to:
Bedford, Quebec (town)
Bedford, Quebec (township), a separate township municipality